Paris Mountain is a peak of Blue Ridge Mountain on the border of Loudoun County and Clarke County in Virginia. The  peak, which is located just north of Ashby's Gap and the town of Paris, for which it is named, represents the highest elevation in both counties. The peak is accessible by Blue Ridge Mountain Road from the gap. The Appalachian Trail crosses the western slope of the peak.

References

Mountains of Virginia
Mountains of Loudoun County, Virginia
Mountains of Clarke County, Virginia
Blue Ridge Mountains